Catamacta lotinana is a species of moth of the family Tortricidae. It is found in New Zealand.

References

Archipini
Moths described in 1883
Moths of New Zealand
Taxa named by Edward Meyrick